RSN Racing & Sport (ACMA callsign: 3UZ) is an Australian radio station in Australia. Owned and operated by thoroughbred, harness and greyhound racing bodies of Victoria, it broadcasts a sports radio format to Melbourne, and to much of Victoria through various repeater stations. First broadcast as 3UZ on 8 March 1925, it was in 1986 sold to the state's racing bodies. Today, the majority of the station's programming is dedicated to coverage of thoroughbred, harness and greyhound racing.

History

As 3UZ
3UZ was founded by electrical engineer Oliver John Nilsen CBE, who was later to become a Lord Mayor of Melbourne. Known as "O.J.", Nilsen had created an electrical business, Oliver J. Nilsen & Co. (later Oliver J. Nilsen (Australia) Ltd) in 1916, manufacturing electric jugs, kettles, toasters, crystal sets and radios.

On 6 February 1925, Nilsen was granted a broadcasting licence, and in March 3UZ commenced operations as "The Voice of Victoria". Initially, the station broadcast on 930 kHz AM from studios in 45 Bourke Street, under Victoria's first "B-class" licence, permitting it to broadcast paid advertisements. At the time, other stations were dependent on subscriptions. 3UZ's first lineup saw Keith Cooke engaged as chief announcer, with Leslie Dobson, George Cowley, Dulcie Cherry and Gertrude Hutton included as the first "night artists".

 "...has received many favourable comments from Tasmania, South Australia and New South Wales, and many remote country districts in Victoria on its transmission."

In 1929, 3UZ, along with rival Melbourne station 3DB, participated in experimental television broadcasts using the Radiovision system. In 1978, with the implementation of 9 kHz spacing on the AM band, the station moved to 927 kHz.

Over the sixty years between 1925 and 1985, the station achieved consistent top ratings as "The Greater 3UZ", with stars including Stan "The Man" Rofe, John McMahon, Nicky Whitta, Graham Kennedy, Happy Hammond, Allan Lappan, Don Lunn, Ken Sparkes, John Vertigan, Neil Thompson, Martha Gardener, Stephanie Deste, Don Lane and Bert Newton.

In 1985, the Nilsen family sold 3UZ for $9.2 million to Launceston-based ENT Limited, associated with the controversial figure Edmund Rouse.

Programmes
A handful of programme titles from 3UZ's history:

 Bolero
 Clancy Of The Overflow 
 Crosbie Morrison Session 
 Dan Dare
 Grouches and Appreciations
 Harry Dearth's Playhouse
 Hymn for the Day
 NewsbeatNews Beat reported motor vehicle accidents in Melbourne, with audio recorded at the scene, interviewing witnesses and tow-truck drivers and typically ending with "... and here is the police report". Eventually, Newsbeat reporter Neil Thompson attended a fatal accident which turned out be his own son's. In later years, the program broadened its focus to include any calls made on emergency services – ambulance, fire police. It was broadcast on Sunday mornings, with the tagline "this was Melbourne, overnight". In the 1980s, it was hosted by Paul Makin.
 Portia Faces Life
 Radio AuditionsHosted by Johnny McMahon, Radio Auditions was an extraordinarily long-lived talent show in which participants were awarded up to three "gongs". By the late 1960s it had become a rather sad affair, with Shirley Radford heroically attempting to provide piano accompaniment to nervous persons whose ambitions exceeded their talent. Entertainer Barry Crocker first appeared on the programme as did Jamie Redfern who went on to appear with Shirley Radford on HSV7's "Brian and The Juniors". Shirley Radford was best known for her showcasing talented musicians. Launching the career for none other than Roselyn Della Sabina.  
 Tailwaggers’ Club
 The Early Risers’ Club
 Who's Who in Rhythm

As Sport 927
However, just one year later, 3UZ was onsold to the Victorian thoroughbred, harness and greyhound racing bodies. In 1988, the station re-introduced horse racing coverage, leading the station to rebrand as Sport 927 in 1996. Throughout the late 1990s and 2000s, the station would acquire various AM and FM open narrowcast radio stations, as well as Shepparton-based 3SR, extending coverage across Victoria. It also established 3BT as a Ballarat-based rebroadcaster as 3BA transferred to the FM band, and affiliated with ACTTAB Radio and TOTE Sport Radio.

In 2004, the station participated in DAB digital radio trials in Melbourne, alongside 3RRR, ABC Classic FM, ABC DiG, Radio 2 and SBS Radio. In May, the station took Nielsen Media Research to court, citing "hundreds of thousands of dollars" in lost advertising revenue due to ratings reporting policies. The case returned in April, and reached a settlement in September.<ref>{{cite news|title=Sport 927 in Court for Ratings' 'Damages|url=https://www.radioinfo.com.au/news/sport-927-court-ratings-damages|access-date=25 July 2015|work=Radioinfo|date=21 April 2004}}</ref>

As RSN Racing and Sport
Briefly, in 2011, the station rebranded as Radio Sport National. However, coinciding with the pending sale of Tote Tasmania to Tatts Group, the station rebranded as RSN Racing & Sport. Following this sale, RSN was replaced on its Tasmanian frequencies by Brisbane-based RadioTAB. ACTTAB Radio eventually dropped RSN coverage, in favour of that from Sydney-based network Sky Sports Radio.

Frequencies
 3UZ Melbourne 927 AM
 3BT Ballarat 1314 AM
 3SR Shepparton 1260 AM
 Bairnsdale 87.6 FM
 Bendigo 945 AM
 Casterton 88.0 FM
 Coleraine 87.6 FM
 Heyfield 88.0 FM
 Heywood 88.0 FM
 Horsham 88.0 FM
 Lakes Entrance 89.9 FM
 Mildura 1359 AM
 Moe 88.0 FM
 Morwell 88.0 FM
 Orbost 95.5 FM
 Sale 87.6 FM
 Swan Hill 106.9 FM
 Traralgon 87.6 FM
 Wangaratta 99.3 FM
 Yarram 92.7 FM

Digital radio
In Melbourne, RSN Racing & Sport is simulcast on DAB+ digital radio. The station operates two separate stations – RSN Carnival and RSN Carnival 2,TAB Live. All four stations stream online.

See also
 Radio Times''

References

External links
biography of Oliver John Nilsen
Nilsen company website
video of 3UZ tower demolition
 "Penelope"
1970 ad featuring DJ Don Lunn

Radio stations in Melbourne
Radio stations in Ballarat
Radio stations in Bendigo
Radio stations in Victoria
Radio stations established in 1925
1925 establishments in Australia
Sports radio stations in Australia